Tenley Emma Albright (born July 18, 1935) is an American former figure skater and surgeon. She is the 1956 Olympic champion, the 1952 Olympic silver medalist, the 1953 and 1955 World Champion, the 1953 and 1955 North American champion, and the 1952–1956 U.S. national champion. Albright is also a graduate of Harvard Medical School. In 2015, she was inducted into the National Women's Hall of Fame.

Figure skating career 

Albright was born in Newton, Massachusetts. Her father was a surgeon who wanted his daughter to be active in sports. Each winter, he would flood an area behind his house to create a skating rink for Albright and her friends. She was able to cut figure eights into the ice by the time she was nine years old. Just two years later, she entered and won the U.S. Eastern Junior Championship. That same year, she contracted polio. It turned out to be a mild case but it still left her muscles “weak and withered”. She started training at the Skating Club of Boston as part of her rehabilitation. Although rehabilitation is a chore for many, she found it “exhilarating”. She would later say, "Did you ever notice how many athletes my age once had polio? I think it's because being paralyzed makes you aware of your muscles and you never want to let them go unused again”.

Albright won the silver medal at the 1952 Olympics. She won her first World title in 1953, silver in 1954, a second gold medal in 1955, and her fourth medal, silver, in 1956. In 1955 she recorded a triple— winning the US, North American and World Championships that year. She managed to do this while enrolled as a full-time pre-med student at Radcliffe College.

She won the US National Junior Championship at the age of 14, and then won five consecutive national titles starting at age 16. In 1956, while training for the Olympics, Albright fell due to a rut in the ice and cut her right ankle joint to the bone with her left skate. The cut was stitched by her father, a surgeon. At the 1956 Winter Olympics in Cortina d'Ampezzo, Italy, she became the first American female skater to win an Olympic gold medal.

Albright retired from competitive skating after 1956 but remained attached to figure skating as a sports functionary. In 1982 she became a vice president of the U.S. Olympic Committee.

Medical career 

A graduate of The Winsor School in Boston, Albright entered Radcliffe College in 1953 as a pre-med student, and focused on completing her education after the 1956 Olympics. She graduated from Harvard Medical School in 1961 at the age of 24, went on to become a surgeon, and she practiced for 23 years, continuing as a faculty member and lecturer at Harvard Medical School. For a while, she chaired the Board of Regents of the National Library of Medicine at the National Institutes of Health. As a director, she has served both not-for-profits such as The Whitehead Institute for Biomedical Research and the Woods Hole Oceanographic Institution and for-profit enterprises such as West Pharmaceutical Services, Inc., and State Street Bank and Trust Company. She is currently the Director of the MIT Collaborative Initiatives.

In 1976 she served as the chief physician for the US Winter Olympic team. The American Academy of Achievement presented her with a Golden Plate Award in 1976. Her accomplishments earned her an induction into the International Women's Sports Hall of Fame in 1983.

Personal life

Tenley Albright was born to Hollis Albright, a prominent Boston surgeon. Albright was married to Tudor Gardiner, a lawyer and son of William Tudor Gardiner, from 1962 to 1976. In 1981-2021 she was married to former Ritz-Carlton hotel owner Gerald Blakeley, who shared her association with Woods Hole and was chair of The Morehouse School of Medicine. He died on July 2, 2021.

Results

References

External links 

 
  
 Tenley Albright at the National Women's Hall of Fame
 
 
 

1935 births
Living people
American female single skaters
American surgeons
Figure skaters at the 1952 Winter Olympics
Figure skaters at the 1956 Winter Olympics
Harvard Medical School alumni
Medalists at the 1952 Winter Olympics
Medalists at the 1956 Winter Olympics
Olympic gold medalists for the United States in figure skating
Olympic silver medalists for the United States in figure skating
Radcliffe College alumni
Sportspeople from Newton, Massachusetts
Winsor School alumni
World Figure Skating Championships medalists
21st-century American women